Sweetwater Township may refer to:
 Sweetwater Township, Clay County, North Carolina
 Sweetwater Township, Lake County, Michigan